Dobry (masculine), Dobraya (feminine), or Dobroye (neuter) is the name of several  rural localities in Russia.

Belgorod Oblast
As of 2010, two rural localities in Belgorod Oblast bear this name:
Dobroye, Grayvoronsky District, Belgorod Oblast, a selo in Grayvoronsky District
Dobroye, Shebekinsky District, Belgorod Oblast, a selo in Shebekinsky District

Jewish Autonomous Oblast
As of 2010, one rural locality in the Jewish Autonomous Oblast bears this name:
Dobroye, Jewish Autonomous Oblast, a selo in Oktyabrsky District

Kaliningrad Oblast
As of 2010, one rural locality in Kaliningrad Oblast bears this name:
Dobroye, Kaliningrad Oblast, a settlement in Nizovsky Rural Okrug of Guryevsky District

Kaluga Oblast
As of 2010, three rural localities in Kaluga Oblast bear this name:
Dobroye, Maloyaroslavetsky District, Kaluga Oblast, a village in Maloyaroslavetsky District
Dobroye, Zhukovsky District, Kaluga Oblast, a village in Zhukovsky District
Dobraya, Kaluga Oblast, a village in Baryatinsky District

Kursk Oblast
As of 2010, one rural locality in Kursk Oblast bears this name:
Dobroye, Kursk Oblast, a selo in Dobro-Kolodezsky Selsoviet of Solntsevsky District

Lipetsk Oblast
As of 2010, one rural locality in Lipetsk Oblast bears this name:
Dobroye, Lipetsk Oblast, a selo in Dobrovsky Selsoviet of Dobrovsky District

Moscow Oblast
As of 2010, one rural locality in Moscow Oblast bears this name:
Dobroye, Moscow Oblast, a settlement in Tsarevskoye Rural Settlement of Pushkinsky District

Oryol Oblast
As of 2010, one rural locality in Oryol Oblast bears this name:
Dobry, Oryol Oblast, a settlement in Saburovsky Selsoviet of Orlovsky District

Smolensk Oblast
As of 2010, two rural localities in Smolensk Oblast bear this name:
Dobry, Smolensk Oblast, a village in Bogdanovskoye Rural Settlement of Roslavlsky District
Dobroye, Smolensk Oblast, a village in Slobodskoye Rural Settlement of Ugransky District

Tula Oblast
As of 2010, two rural localities in Tula Oblast bear this name:
Dobroye, Bogoroditsky District, Tula Oblast, a village in Krasnobuytsky Rural Okrug of Bogoroditsky District
Dobroye, Suvorovsky District, Tula Oblast, a selo in Dobrinskaya Rural Territory of Suvorovsky District

Tver Oblast
As of 2010, three rural localities in Tver Oblast bear this name:
Dobroye, Ostashkovsky District, Tver Oblast, a village in Ostashkovsky District
Dobroye, Penovsky District, Tver Oblast, a village in Penovsky District
Dobraya, Tver Oblast, a village in Rzhevsky District